Tai Ping Shan, Taipingshan, Taiping Mountain, or Mount Taiping may refer to: 

 Victoria Peak, a mountain in the western half of Hong Kong Island
 Tai Ping Shan Street, a street marking the early colonial history in Hong Kong
 Taiping Mountain, in Ilan on Taiwan

See also
 Taiping (disambiguation)